Jarosław Gierejkiewicz (born 3 September 1965) is a Polish footballer. He played in one match for the Poland national football team in 1992.

References

External links
 
 

1965 births
Living people
Polish footballers
Poland international footballers
Association football midfielders
Sportspeople from Białystok